A parasitic disease, also known as parasitosis, is an infectious disease caused by parasites. Parasites are organisms which derive sustenance from its host while causing it harm. The study of parasites and parasitic diseases is known as parasitology. Medical parasitology is concerned with three major groups of parasites: parasitic protozoa, helminths, and parasitic arthropods. Parasitic diseases are thus considered those diseases that are caused by pathogens belonging taxonomically to either the animal kingdom, or the protozoan kingdom.

Terminology
Although organisms such as bacteria function as parasites, the usage of the term "parasitic disease" is usually more restricted. The three main types of organisms causing these conditions are protozoa (causing protozoan infection), helminths (helminthiasis), and ectoparasites. Protozoa and helminths are usually endoparasites (usually living inside the body of the host), while ectoparasites usually live on the surface of the host. Protozoa are single-celled, microscopic organisms that belong to the kingdom Protista. Helminths on the other hand are macroscopic, multicellular organisms that belong to the kingdom Animalia. Protozoans obtain their required nutrients through pinocytosis and phagocytosis. Helminths of class Cestoidea and Trematoda absorb nutrients, whereas nematodes obtain needed nourishment through ingestion. Occasionally the definition of "parasitic disease" is restricted to diseases due to endoparasites.

Transmission

Mammals can get parasites from contaminated food or water, bug bites, sexual contact, or contact with animals.

Some ways in which people may acquire parasitic infections are walking barefoot, inadequate disposal of feces, lack of hygiene, close contact with someone carrying specific parasites, and eating undercooked foods, unwashed fruits and vegetables or foods from contaminated regions.

Treatment
Parasitic infections can usually be treated with antiparasitic drugs. The use of viruses to treat infections caused by protozoa has been proposed.

See also
 Protozoan infection
 Babesiosis
 Giardiasis

References

External links